Tomáš Votava (born 21 February 1974) is a Czech former footballer who played as a defender. In his native country he won five league titles with AC Sparta Prague, before moving to TSV 1860 Munich in 1999. His time in Munich was marred by injury, and he only managed 49 league games in four years, leaving for APOEL in 2003. After one year in Cyprus, he returned to Germany, joining SpVgg Greuther Fürth, then moving on to Dynamo Dresden eighteen months later. He retired in 2008.

Honours
UEFA Under-16 Championship: 1990
Czech First League: 1994, 1995, 1997, 1998, 1999
Czech Cup: 1996
Cypriot First Division: 2004

External links
 
 

1974 births
Living people
People from Brandýs nad Labem-Stará Boleslav
Czech footballers
Czech Republic under-21 international footballers
Czech expatriate footballers
Czech Republic international footballers
Association football defenders
Dukla Prague footballers
AC Sparta Prague players
TSV 1860 Munich players
SpVgg Greuther Fürth players
APOEL FC players
Dynamo Dresden players
Czech First League players
Bundesliga players
2. Bundesliga players
Cypriot First Division players
Expatriate footballers in Germany
Expatriate footballers in Cyprus
Sportspeople from the Central Bohemian Region